The Rise of Phoenixes is a 2018 Chinese television series that is loosely based on the novel Huang Quan by Tianxia Guiyuan, taking place in the fictional kingdom of Tiansheng. It stars Chen Kun and Ni Ni. The series premiered on Hunan Television starting August 14, 2018, and then on Netflix starting on September 14, 2018. It became one of the highest rated shows of the year, was nominated for several awards including for Best Drama Series at the Asian Television Awards, and won for best cinematography at the 25th Shanghai Television Festival.

Synopsis
Ning Yi (Chen Kun) is the highly intelligent and calculating sixth prince of the Tiansheng kingdom. He has learned to hide his true personality behind a carefree façade after the corrupt and duplicitous court officials charged the third prince Ning Qiao, Ning Yi's older half-brother, with high treason. Over the next decade, he establishes a secret information network led by Qingming Academy's headmaster (equivalent to a modern-day college chancellor) Xin Ziyan, and waits for the perfect chance to strike down his enemies and overturn the charges laid against his half-brother, whom he sees as a just ruler.
 
Feng Zhiwei (Ni Ni) is the niece of Colonel Qiu, who is supposed to take the place of Qiu's daughter in an arranged marriage to Ning Yi. After convincing him to call off the marriage, she is banished from her household after being falsely accused of a crime. With the help of Ning Yi and Headmaster Xin, she dresses as a man and joins the prestigious Qingming Academy, to help them serve their purpose. She enters court as the Ultimate Scholar (Royal Designated Scholar) and becomes an official after stunning the world with her talent and knowledge.

Feng Zhiwei remains loyal and honest to the reigning Emperor as Wei Zhi, who values her candid, wise advice during the princes’ fight for the throne, but she is forced to reveal her true identity when the emperor wants to marry Wei Zhi to his daughter. After being arrested and sentenced to death, she is pardoned thanks to Ning Yi, Headmaster Xin, and the emperor's head eunuch, and sent on a diplomatic mission alongside the prince of Chu. While on the mission, her feelings for Ning Yi as well as his for her become evident to both. After Ning Yi contracts a contagious disease while trying to demolish the power of the Chang family and nearly dies, he confesses to her and she confesses back to him, and they plan to ask the emperor to allow them to marry when they get back to the capital.

Feng ultimately finds out she is surviving royalty from the previous empire. Manipulated into thinking that the current kingdom of Tiansheng was built upon the corpses of her loved ones, Zhiwei decides to take revenge against her enemies, including Ning Yi.

Cast

Main

Supporting

Tiansheng Kingdom Royal Family

Tiansheng Kingdom Court Officials and Servants

People of Tiansheng Kingdom

Cheng Dynasty

Jinshi Tribe

Kingdom of Yue

Production
Principal photography commenced on 27 May 2017, and filming wrapped up on 12 December 2017. It was revealed that the series also uses "real-time" voice recording during filming.

Crew
The series is directed by Shen Yan and Liu Haibo (Chinese Style Relationship), and written by internet novel writers Lu Jing (original author), Lu Yi, Zou Yue, Wang Pei and Qiu Yongyi. Costume designer and artistic director William Chang (The Flowers of War, The Grandmaster) was in charge of costumes designing along with Lu Fengshan and Fang Sizhe. Other notable crew members include stunt choreographer Yuan Bin (Flying Swords of Dragon Gate), stills photographer Bao Xiangyu (Coming Home, Mojin: The Lost Legend), composer Dong Yingda (Sweet Sixteen, All Quiet in Peking), cinematographer Li Xi (Love is Not Blind), artistic director Kun Xiaotong, editor Zhang Jia (Go Lala Go!). and etiquette consultant Li Bin (Nirvana in Fire, The Legend of Mi Yue).

Casting
On 20 October 2016, Chen Kun was announced as the male lead. On 7 March 2017, Ni Ni was announced as the female lead; this also marks Ni Ni's first television series. The extended cast was revealed on 27 April 2017.

Location
The series is the first television drama to be filmed in Tang City Film Studios, Xiangyang, which was built specifically for Chen Kaige's fantasy film The Legend of the Cat Demon. Reportedly, the location was picked not only because it fits the time period of the story setting, but also because the location is not featured in dramas frequently, as most historical/ancient Chinese dramas are filmed at Hengdian World Studios. The series was also filmed in other places including Wuxi and Duyun.

Post-production
In September 2017, cast members Zhao Lixin and Zhang Xiaochen attended the Weibo Awards Ceremony, where The Rise of Phoenixes was awarded the "Most Anticipated Television Series" award.

In May 2018, it was revealed that the Chinese name for the series was changed from "凰权•弈天下 (Huang Quan Yi Tian Xia)" to "天盛长歌 (Tiansheng Chang Ge)" and the episode count was officially confirmed to be 70 episodes.

Soundtrack

Reception
Due to its slow pacing and heavy plot, the series received low viewership ratings, and the original 70 episodes were cut down to 56 episodes on television. However, Douban gave it a score of 8.3/10 with over 113,000 votes, making it the highest rated show out of all the dramas that aired over the summer holidays and one of the highest rated TV dramas of the year so far.

Ratings

Awards and nominations

References

External links
 

Hunan Television dramas
Mandarin-language Netflix original programming
Television shows based on Chinese novels
Chinese historical television series
2018 Chinese television series debuts
Television series by Croton Media
2018 Chinese television series endings